Winsemius is a Dutch surname. Notable people with the surname include:

 Albert Winsemius (1910–1996), Dutch economist, economic advisor for Singapore
 Pieter Winsemius (born 1942), Dutch politician and government minister

Dutch-language surnames